Zhang Lei (born 20 December 1972), is a Chinese actor best known for his role as "journalist Ga Yu" in the 2004 Movie Kekexili: Mountain Patrol film by Chinese director Lu Chuan (陆川). He is currently an artist of National Theatre Company of China - NTCC (中国国家话剧院).

Early life
Zhang was born in Ürümqi City, Xinjiang Province, China. He graduated from the Department of Stage Arts at the Central Academy of Drama in 1999.

Career
In 2003, Zhang take his role as Ga Yu in the film Kekexili: Mountain Patrol filmed by Chinese director Lu Chuan (陆川) based on true events.   Kekexili: Mountain Patrol is more or less told from the point of view of Ga yu, an ambitious young journalist from Beijing whose idea to report on the mountain patrol may just end up being his last.  During the filming, Zhang and the crew faced a life challenge, just like the characters in the film.   Zhang once told a reporter " I couldn't stand the pain of the AMS in the beginning and dreamt about going back home every day. It took me one whole month to get used to everything, and now I just wanted to complete my work well."

After Kekexili, Zhang embarked on a number of television series, most of which had a Chinese civil war theme.

Filmography

Film

Television

References

External links
Zhang Lei's personal blog on Sina 
Zhang Lei's official Baidu forum 
Zhang Lei's Sina Weibo

1972 births
Living people
Central Academy of Drama alumni
People from Ürümqi
Male actors from Xinjiang
Chinese male film actors
Chinese male television actors